Mohammad Shahiduddin (1923-21 March 1990) is a Bangladesh Awami League politician and the former Member of Parliament of Meherpur-1. He was one of the organizers of the Liberation War of Bangladesh.

Early life 
Mohammad Shahiduddin was born on 1923. His father Md. Yakub Biswas and mother Samchun Nesha. He passed matriculation from VJ High School in Chuadanga district and got admission in Rajshahi Government College.

His son Farhad Hossain is the State Minister for Public Administration and Member of Parliament from Meherpur-1 constituency.

Career 
Sahiuddin was the founding president of Meherpur Awami League. In 1956 he was elected the first chairman of Meherpur municipality. He was elected Member of the National Assembly (MNA) as a nominee of the Bangladesh Awami League in the 1970 Pakistan National Assembly elections. He was one of the organizers of the Liberation War of Bangladesh. He served as a Member of Parliament in the Government of Bangladesh during the War of Liberation in 1971. He was the governor of Meherpur in the Bakshal government in 1975.

Shahiduddin was one of the organizers of the Liberation War of Bangladesh. He was elected to parliament from Kushtia-5 as a Bangladesh Awami League candidate in 1973. He was elected to parliament from Meherpur-1 as a Bangladesh Awami League candidate in 1986.

Death 
Mohammad Shahiduddin died on 21 March 1990.

References 

1923 births
1990 deaths
People from Meherpur District
Awami League politicians
1st Jatiya Sangsad members
3rd Jatiya Sangsad members